Heye may refer to:

People
Libertas Haas-Heye
George Gustav Heye
The George Gustav Heye Center
Hellmuth Heye

Places
Heye, Shuangfeng County, a rural town in Shuangfeng County, Hunan, China
Heye, Guiyang County, a rural town in Guiyang County, Hunan, China